Filip Klapka (born 20 June 1981) is a footballer from Czech Republic playing currently for SC Pyhra in Austria.

References
 Profile at iDNES.cz
 Guardian Football

Czech footballers
Czech First League players
FC Hradec Králové players
FK Jablonec players
Czech expatriate footballers
Expatriate footballers in Austria
1981 births
Living people
Sportspeople from Hradec Králové
Association football midfielders
FC Tobol players